The 6th Golden Globe Awards, honoring the best in film for 1948 films, were held on March 16, 1949.

Winners

Best Picture (tie)
 Johnny Belinda directed by Jean Negulesco and The Treasure of the Sierra Madre directed by John Huston

Best Actor in a Leading Role
Laurence Olivier - Hamlet

Best Actress in a Leading Role
 Jane Wyman - Johnny Belinda

Best Performance by an Actor in a Supporting Role in a Motion Picture
 Walter Huston - The Treasure of the Sierra Madre

Best Performance by an Actress in a Supporting Role in a Motion Picture
 Ellen Corby - I Remember Mama

Best Director-Motion Picture
 John Huston - The Treasure of the Sierra Madre

Best Screenplay - Motion Picture
 The Search written by Richard Schweizer

Best Music, Original Score - Motion Picture
 The Red Shoes composed by Brian Easdale

Cinematography
 La perla photographed by Gabriel Figueroa

Special Award - Best Juvenile Actor
 Ivan Jandl in The Search

Promoting International Understanding
 The Search directed by Fred Zinnemann

See also
 Hollywood Foreign Press Association
 2nd British Academy Film Awards
 21st Academy Awards
 1948 in film

References

006
1948 film awards
1948 television awards
March 1949 events in the United States